Lahaina Cannery Mall is a shopping mall located in Lahaina, Maui, Hawaii.  It is the island's only fully enclosed, air-conditioned mall, and encompasses .  It has more than 50 boutiques, restaurants and specialty shops.  Opened in 1987, the mall boasts a variety of boutique retail stores combined with casual restaurants and an exceptional international food court.  The mall is also anchored by a 24-hour Safeway grocery store and a Longs Drugs store.

History
West Maui's roots in the historic pineapple industry began in 1912, when David T. Fleming began growing pineapple there for the Maui Pineapple Company.  In 1920 the name was changed to Baldwin Packers, which grew pineapple at the Honolua Plantation and then canned it nearby. Less than a mile from Lahaina harbor, tons of the exotic, succulent fruit were processed and canned at the historic Baldwin Packers pineapple cannery. The Baldwins' growing and canning operations in Lahaina continued for many decades.  However, in 1962 the Baldwins' east and west Maui holdings and pineapple operations were united when Baldwin Packers merged with Maui Pineapple Company.  It was around that time that the Baldwin Packers pineapple cannery in west Maui was closed.

Beginning in the mid-1980s, plans were established for a shopping center on the site of the old cannery.  When developer Hawaii Omori Inc. began planning on the shopping center, the first idea was to reuse the Baldwin Packers cannery.  When that proved impractical, the distinctive corrugated style and factory-like open conduits inside were adopted for the design.  When the mall was built in 1987, it was designed to look like a pineapple cannery.

References

Shopping malls in Hawaii
Shopping malls established in 1987
Buildings and structures in Maui County, Hawaii
Lahaina, Hawaii
1987 establishments in Hawaii